The 1946 Muhlenberg Mules football team was an American football team that represented Muhlenberg College during the 1946 college football season.  In its first season under head coach Ben Schwartzwalder, Muhlenberg compiled a 9–1 record, defeated St. Bonaventure in the Tobacco Bowl, and outscored opponents by a total of 307 to 99. The team's only loss was to Delaware by a 20–12 score. The team played its home games at Muhlenberg Field in Allentown, Pennsylvania.

Muhlenberg ranked first nationally among small college programs with an average of 425.9 yards of total offense per game. The team also ranked fifth nationally in total defense, giving up an average of only 115.4 yards per game. 

Muhlenberg fullback Jack Crider was the leading scorer among all college football players in the East with 90 points on 15 touchdowns in nine games. He also ranked fifth nationally.

Schedule

After the season

The 1947 NFL Draft was held on December 16, 1946. The following Mules were selected.

References

Muhlenberg
Muhlenberg Mules football seasons
Muhlenberg Mules football